Aleksandr Fyodorovich Akimov (6 May 1953 – 11 May 1986) was a Soviet engineer who was the supervisor of the shift that worked at the Chernobyl Nuclear Power Plant Reactor Unit 4 on the night of the Chernobyl disaster, 26 April 1986.

Biography
Aleksandr Akimov was born on 6 May 1953 in Novosibirsk, Russian SFSR (Republic of the Soviet Union).

In 1976, Akimov graduated from the Moscow Power Engineering Institute, with the degree of specialist in engineering and automation of heat and power processes.

He began his career at the Chernobyl Nuclear Power Plant in September 1979. During his first years at Chernobyl, he held positions of senior turbine management engineer and shift supervisor of the turbine hall.

On 10 July 1984 Akimov was appointed to the position of shift supervisor of Reactor Unit 4. 

In his personal life, Akimov enjoyed reading historical biographies and hunting. He was well liked by his colleagues but could be pushed around by his superiors.

Chernobyl disaster
On the night of 26 April 1986, Akimov was on duty as the shift supervisor of the Chernobyl' electronuclear plant 4th power unit. The reactor power level had been reduced, preparing for a planned safety test. The reactor stalled unexpectedly during test preparations, however, reportedly due to a mistake made by Leonid Toptunov. Raising power after this point put the reactor into a potentially dangerous state, due to design flaws in the reactor unbeknownst to the operators. During the test, Akimov called for the AZ-5 (scram) button to be pressed to shut down the reactor. Due to a design flaw, the descending control rods momentarily accelerated the nuclear reaction and caused the reactor to explode. The communications networks were suddenly flooded with calls and information. Akimov heard reports of massive reactor damage, but did not believe it, and as a result, relayed false information about the state of the reactor for hours thereafter.

Akimov worked with his crew in the reactor building after he learned the extent of the accident. They tried to pump water into the exposed reactor core until the morning. He worked with Toptunov to manually open water valves in an attempt to increase water supply to the reactor, during which time they began to notice acute radiation syndrome on themselves and were sent to the infirmary. Akimov was exposed during his work to a lethal dose of 15-20 Gy of radiation.

He was admitted to Pripyat Hospital but was quickly transferred to Moscow Hospital 6. By 28 April, the symptoms of radiation sickness had mostly worn away. His wife visited him in hospital and while aware he might not survive, he told her that he would give up working in the nuclear industry. During his stay, he discussed possible causes of the accident with Toptunov and Dyatlov but they were mystified. Toptunov and Akimov received a bone marrow transplant in an attempt to restore their immune systems. Akimov's condition quickly worsened. By the time accident investigator Sergei Yankovsky questioned him, Akimov could barely speak and was not able to provide much more information. Akimov eventually succumbed to acute radiation syndrome two weeks after the disaster at the age of 33. His family was informed that his death was the only reason he was not prosecuted for the accident.

While the initial Soviet investigation put almost all the blame on the operators, later findings by the IAEA found that the reactor design and how the operators were informed of safety information was more significant. Nonetheless, the operators were found to have deviated from operational procedures, changing test protocols on the fly, as well as having made "ill judged" actions, making human factors a major contributing factor.

Recognition
In 2008, Akimov was posthumously awarded with the 3rd degree Order For Courage by Viktor Yushchenko, the then President of Ukraine.

He was portrayed by actor Aleksandr Khoroshko in the 2004 Zero Hour television series, by Alex Lowe in the 2006 BBC production Surviving Disaster: Chernobyl Nuclear Disaster and by Sam Troughton in the 2019 HBO miniseries Chernobyl.

See also
Deaths due to the Chernobyl disaster

References

 Рыжиков, 1994, p. 138.

External links

Chernobyl liquidators
People from Novosibirsk
20th-century Ukrainian engineers
1953 births
1986 deaths
Soviet engineers
Victims of radiological poisoning
Recipients of the Order For Courage, 3rd class